A tank truck, gas truck, fuel truck, or tanker truck (American English) or tanker (British English) is a motor vehicle designed to carry liquids or gases on roads. The largest such vehicles are similar to railroad tank cars, which are also designed to carry liquid loads. Many variants exist due to the wide variety of liquids that can be transported. Tank trucks tend to be large; they may be insulated or non-insulated; pressurized or non-pressurized; and designed for single or multiple loads (often by means of internal divisions in their tank). Some are semi-trailer trucks. They are difficult to drive and highly susceptible to rollover due to their high center of gravity, and potentially the free surface effect of liquids sloshing in a partially filled tank.

History

Oil 
Prior to tank distribution, oil was delivered in cans. From the 1880s, it was distributed in horse-drawn tanks. In 1910, Standard Oil started using motor tankers. Anglo American Oil introduced underground tanks and delivery tankers to the UK in 1920. Elsewhere, development was slower. For example, the first petrol tanker from Auckland to arrive in Hamilton, New Zealand, was greeted by a brass band in 1927.

Size and volume 

Tank trucks are described by their size or volume capacity. Longer road trains transporting liquids are also in use.

A tank truck is distinguished by its shape, usually a cylindrical tank upon the vehicle lying horizontally. Some less visible distinctions amongst tank trucks have to do with their intended use: compliance with human food regulations, refrigeration capability, acid resistance, pressurization capability, and more.  The tanks themselves will almost always contain multiple compartments or baffles to prevent load movement destabilizing the vehicle.

Common large tank trucks 
Large tank trucks are used for example to transport gasoline, diesel, and liquefied petroleum or natural gas to filling stations. They also transport a wide variety of liquid goods such as liquid sugar, molasses, milk, wine, juices, water, and industrial chemicals.

Tank trucks are constructed of various materials depending on what products they are hauling. These materials include aluminum, carbon steel, stainless steel, and fiberglass-reinforced plastic (FRP).

Some tank trucks are able to carry multiple products at once due to compartmentalization of the tank into 2, 3, 4, 5, 6, or, in some rare cases, more tank compartments. This allows for an increased number of delivery options. These trucks are commonly used to carry different grades of gasoline to service stations to carry all products needed in one trip.

Common small tank trucks 
Smaller tank trucks with a capacity under  are typically used to deal with light liquid cargo within a local community. A common example is vacuum truck used to empty several septic tanks and then deliver the collected fecal sludge to a treatment site. They are equipped with a pumping system to serve their particular need.

Another common use is to deliver fuel such as liquified petroleum gas (LPG) to households, businesses, and industries. Typically, LPG tank trucks carry up to 3,499 US gallons of product (usually liquid propane), on a 2-axle bobtail truck. 3,500 US gallons (13,200 L; 2,900 imp gal) and greater requires a 3-axle truck (tank wagon). Some companies use lightweight steel to carry more gallons on single-axle trucks. Notably, one U.S. manufacturer has built a 3,700 gallon tank truck, fitting it on a single axle.

Tank trucks are also used to fuel aircraft at airports.

Gallery

See also 

 Bowser (tanker)
 Dodge Airflow truck
 Pipeline and Hazardous Materials Safety Administration (PHMSA)
 Refuelers
 Semi-trailer truck
 Slosh dynamics
 Tank cars
 Tank chassis
 Tanktainers
 Vacuum truck

References

External links

Driving Tank Trucks for a Living

 
Petroleum transport
Fuel containers
Milk transport